Bathyoncus is a genus of ascidian tunicates in the family Styelidae.

Species within the genus Bathyoncus include:
 Bathyoncus arafurensis Monniot & Monniot, 2003 
 Bathyoncus herdmani Michaelsen, 1904 
 Bathyoncus lanatus Monniot & Monniot, 1991 
 Bathyoncus mirabilis Herdman, 1882 
 Bathyoncus tantulus Monniot & Monniot, 1991

Species names currently considered to be synonyms:
 Bathyoncus enderbyanus Michaelsen, 1904: synonym of Bathystyeloides enderbyanus (Michaelsen, 1904)

References

Stolidobranchia
Tunicate genera
Taxa named by William Abbott Herdman